Chauncey Loomis (September 11, 1780 – April 6, 1817, Albany, New York) was an American politician from New York.

Life
Loomis was a member of the New York State Assembly (Genesee Co.) in 1810 and 1811.

He was a member of the New York State Senate (Western D.) from 1814 until his death, sitting in the 38th, 39th and 40th New York State Legislatures. He died near the end of the session of the Legislature, and was buried at the Presbyterial Burial Ground in Albany.

Sources
The Annals of Albany by Joel Munsell (Vol. 3; page 236)
The New York Civil List compiled by Franklin Benjamin Hough (pages 122f, 143, 183f and 288; Weed, Parsons and Co., 1858)

People from Genesee County, New York
Members of the New York State Assembly
New York (state) state senators
1780s births
1817 deaths
New York (state) Democratic-Republicans
19th-century American politicians